Benjamin S. Lerner (born February 4, 1979) is an American poet, novelist, essayist, and critic. He has been a Fulbright Scholar, a finalist for the Pulitzer Prize for Fiction, a finalist for the National Book Award, a finalist for the National Book Critics Circle Award, a Howard Foundation Fellow, a Guggenheim Fellow, and a MacArthur Fellow, among other honors. In 2011 he won the "Preis der Stadt Münster für internationale Poesie", the first American to receive the honor. Lerner teaches at Brooklyn College, where he was named a Distinguished Professor of English in 2016.

Life and work
Lerner was born and raised in Topeka, Kansas, which figures in each of his books of poetry. His mother is the clinical psychologist Harriet Lerner. He is a 1997 graduate of Topeka High School, where he participated in debate and forensics, winning the 1997 National Forensic League National Tournament in International Extemporaneous Speaking. At Brown University he studied with poet C. D. Wright and earned a B.A. in political theory and an MFA in poetry.

Lerner was awarded the Hayden Carruth prize for his cycle of 52 sonnets, The Lichtenberg Figures.
In 2004 Library Journal named it one of the year's 12 best books of poetry.

In 2003 Lerner traveled on a Fulbright Scholarship to Madrid, Spain, where he wrote his second book of poetry, Angle of Yaw, which was published in 2006. It was named a finalist for the National Book Award. His third poetry collection, Mean Free Path, was published in 2010.

Lerner's first novel, Leaving the Atocha Station, published in 2011, won the Believer Book Award and was a finalist for the Los Angeles Times Book Award for first fiction and the New York Public Library's Young Lions prize. Writing in The Guardian, Geoff Dyer called it "a work so luminously original in style and form as to seem like a premonition, a comet from the future." Excerpts of Lerner's second novel, 10:04, won the Terry Southern Prize from The Paris Review. Writing in the Los Angeles Review of Books, Maggie Nelson called 10:04 a "near perfect piece of literature." Lerner's 2019 novel, The Topeka School, was acclaimed in The New York Times Book Review as "a high-water mark in recent American fiction." Giles Harvey, in The New York Times Magazine, called The Topeka School "the best book yet by the most talented writer of his generation." Lerner’s essays, art criticism, and literary criticism have appeared in Art in America, boundary 2, Frieze, Harper's, The Los Angeles Review of Books, and The New Yorker, among other publications. The Topeka School was a finalist for the 2020 Pulitzer Prize for Fiction.

In 2008 Lerner began editing poetry for Critical Quarterly, a British scholarly publication. In 2016 he became the first poetry editor at Harper's. He has taught at California College of the Arts and the University of Pittsburgh, and in 2010 joined the faculty of the MFA program at Brooklyn College.

In 2016 Lerner became a Fellow of the New York Institute for the Humanities. He received a 2015 MacArthur Fellowship.

Bibliography

Poetry
 
 
 
  Collection of previous three volumes.

Novels 
 Leaving the Atocha Station, Coffee House Press, 2011. 
 10:04, Farrar, Straus and Giroux, 2014. 
 The Topeka School, Farrar, Straus and Giroux, 2019.

Short fiction 

Stories

Non-fiction
The Hatred of Poetry. FSG Originals, 2016.

Edited volumes
Keeping / the window open: Interviews, Statements, Alarms, Excursions. On Keith and Rosmarie Waldrop. Wave Books, 2019.

Collaborations with artists
Blossom. Mack Books, 2015. With Thomas Demand.
The Polish Rider. Mack Books, 2018. With Anna Ostoya.
The Snows of Venice. Spector Books, 2018. With Alexander Kluge
Gold Custody. Mack Books, 2021. With Barbara Bloom
 The Clichés. Song Cave Editions, 2022. With R.H. Quaytman

Awards
 2003 – Hayden Carruth Award
 2003–2004 – Fulbright Fellowship
 2006 – Finalist, National Book Award for Angle of Yaw.
 2006 – Finalist, Northern California Book Awards for Angle of Yaw
 2007 – Kansas Notable Book for Angle of Yaw
 2010–2011 – Howard Foundation Fellowship
 2011 – Preis der Stadt Münster für internationale Poesie
 2011 – Finalist, Los Angeles Times Book Award for first fiction
 2012 – Finalist, Young Lions Fiction Award of the New York Public Library
 2012 – The Believer Book Award
 2012 – Finalist, William Saroyan International Prize for Writing
 2012 – Finalist, PEN/Bingham Award
 2013 – Finalist, James Tait Black Memorial Prize
 2013 – Guggenheim Fellowship
 2014 – Terry Southern Fiction Prize from The Paris Review
 2014 – Finalist, Folio Prize
 2017 - named one of Granta's best young American novelists
 2015–2020 Winner, MacArthur Foundation Fellowship
 2019 Finalist, Folio Prize
 2019 Finalist, National Book Critics Circle Award
 2019 Winner, Kansas Book Award
 2019 Winner, Los Angeles Times Book Prize for Fiction
 2020 Finalist, The Pulitzer Prize for Fiction

References

External links 
An essay about The Topeka School and Lerner's other novels at Harper's
An excerpt from The Topeka School at The New Yorker
Lerner's page and the MacArthur Foundation
An editorial by Lerner against funding cuts in higher education
Interview with Ariana Reines in Bomb Magazine
 Lerner's page at the Guggenheim Foundation
 Lerner's National Book Award page
 Lerner's page at Narrative magazine
 Interview with Lerner in The New Yorker
 Interview with Lerner in The Believer
 Interview with Lerner in Bookforum
 Interview with Lerner in The Huffington Post
 Audio of Lerner poetry reading
 "My First Time" interview with Lerner by The Paris Review

1979 births
Living people
21st-century American male writers
21st-century American novelists
21st-century American poets
American male novelists
American male poets
Believer Book Award winners
Brooklyn College faculty
Brown University alumni
Harper's Magazine people
MacArthur Fellows
The New Yorker people
Novelists from New York (state)
Novelists from Pennsylvania
University of Pittsburgh faculty
Writers from Topeka, Kansas
Fulbright alumni